Citioica anthonilis is a species of moth in the family Saturniidae, which can be found from Central America to Brazil. The species was first described by Gottlieb August Wilhelm Herrich-Schäffer in 1854.

Adult males are gray.

Ecology
The larvae feed on Robinia pseudoacacia and Salix caprea. They are green coloured, and have a black stripe on the side.

References

Moths described in 1854
Ceratocampinae